Retifusus is a genus of sea snails, marine gastropod mollusks in the family Retimohniidae, the true whelks and the like.

Species
Species within the genus Retifusus include:
 Retifusus attenuatus (Golikov & Gulbin, 1977)
 Retifusus buccinoides (Dall, 1913)
 Retifusus daphnelloides (Okutani, 1964)
 Retifusus iturupus (Golikov & Sirenko, 1998) 
 Retifusus jessoensis (Schrenck, 1863)
 Retifusus latericeus (Möller, 1842)
 Retifusus laticingulatus Golikov & Gulbin, 1977
 Retifusus latiplicatus Kosyan & Kantor, 2014
 Retifusus olivaceus (Bartsch, 1929)
 Retifusus parvus (Tiba, 1980)
 Retifusus roseus (Dall, 1877)
 Retifusus similis (Golikov & Gulbin, 1977)
 Retifusus toyamanus (Tiba, 1981)
 Retifusus virens (Dall, 1877)
Species brought into synonymy
 Retifusus brunneus (Dall, 1877): synonym of Retifusus jessoensis (Schrenck, 1863)
 Retifusus incisus (Dall, 1919): synonym of Plicifusus olivaceus (Aurivillius, 1885)
 Retifusus olivaceus (Aurivillius, 1885): synonym of Plicifusus olivaceus (Aurivillius, 1885)
 Retifusus semiplicatus Golikov, 1985: synonym of Retifusus parvus (Tiba, 1980)
 Retifusus yanamii (Yokoyama, 1926): synonym of Retifusus virens (Dall, 1877)

References

 Dall W.H. (1916). Prodrome of a revision of the chrysodomoid whelks of the boreal and arctic regions. Proceedings of the Biological Society of Washington. 29: 7-8.

External links
  Kosyan A.R. & Kantor Y.I. (2014). Revision of the genus Retifusus Dall, 1916 (Gastropoda: Buccinidae). Ruthenica. 24(2): 129-172

Retimohniidae